Ronan Point was a 22-storey tower block in Canning Town in Newham, East London, that partly collapsed on 16 May 1968, only two months after it had opened. A gas explosion blew out some load-bearing walls, causing the collapse of one entire corner of the building; four people died and 17 were injured. The spectacular nature of the failure (caused by both poor design and poor construction) led to a loss of public confidence in high-rise residential buildings, and major changes in British building regulations resulted.

Construction
Ronan Point, named after Deputy Mayor Harry Ronan (a former Chairman of the Housing Committee of the London Borough of Newham), was part of the wave of tower blocks built in the 1960s as cheap, affordable prefabricated housing for inhabitants of West Ham and other areas of London. The tower was built by Taylor Woodrow Anglian using a technique known as large panel system building, which involves casting large concrete prefabricated sections off-site and bolting them together to construct the building. The precast system used was the Danish Larsen & Nielsen system.

Construction started in 1966 and was completed on 11 March 1968.

Collapse
At approximately 5:45 am on 16 May 1968, resident Ivy Hodge went into her kitchen in flat 90, a corner flat on the 18th floor of the building, and lit a match to light the gas stove for a cup of tea. The match sparked a gas explosion that blew out the load-bearing flank walls, which had been supporting the four flats above. It is believed that the weaknesses were in the joints connecting the vertical walls to the floor slabs. The flank walls fell away, leaving the floors above unsupported and causing the progressive collapse of the south-east corner of the building.

The building had just opened, and three of the four flats immediately above Hodge's were unoccupied. Four of the 260 residents died immediately and seventeen were injured, including a young mother who was stranded on a narrow ledge when the rest of her living room disappeared. Hodge survived, having been blown across the room and clear of the collapsing walls by the explosion – as did her gas stove, which she took to her new address.

Griffiths inquiry

In the immediate aftermath of the collapse, the government commissioned an inquiry, led by Hugh Griffiths, QC. It reported on dangers caused by pressure on the walls from explosion, wind, or fire, finding that although the design had complied with the current regulations, the following recommendations should be implemented:
Gas supplies should be disconnected from existing tall buildings until they have been strengthened
Consideration should be given to a requirement to notify the gas board of new gas installations
Consideration should be given to improving ventilation in high blocks
The regulations for the storage of explosive materials in high blocks should be reviewed
All blocks over six storeys should be appraised by a structural engineer
Where necessary high blocks should be strengthened 
Designers of new tall blocks should design them so they are not susceptible to progressive collapse
Designers should have regard to recent research on frequency and duration of high wind speeds etc
Designers should have regard to the effects of fire on the structural behaviour of the building

Subsequent rebuilding and later demolition
Ronan Point was partly rebuilt after the explosion, using strengthened joints designed to deal with those issues, and the Building Regulations were altered to ensure that similar designs would not be permitted in the future. However, public confidence in the safety of residential tower blocks was irreparably shaken, and the public scepticism was later found to be appropriate.

Sam Webb, an architect who had given evidence to the Griffiths inquiry, predicted that after approximately 15 years, Ronan Point would develop structural problems and collapse. Webb's concerns eventually led the council to evacuate the building, and then to demolish it in 1986 in a piecemeal manner (rather than, for example, using explosives). When this was done, the extent of the defects found shocked even some of the activists, including Webb himself. On the lower floors, cracks were found in the concrete where it had been point-loaded, and it was alleged that the extra pressure on those points during a high wind (such as during the Great Storm of 1987, barely a year after the demolition) would soon have led to building collapse.

Effect on legislation
The partial collapse of Ronan Point led to major changes in building regulations. The first of these came with the 5th Amendment to the Building Regulations in 1970. These are now embodied in Part A of the Building Regulations and cover "Disproportionate Collapse". They require that "the building shall be constructed so that in the event of an accident the building will not suffer collapse to an extent disproportionate to the cause". They specifically cover pressures which may be caused for example by wind forces, explosions (either internal or external), or vehicle incursions, and note that seismic design may occasionally be required.

Immediately after the publication of the report the Government brought out interim measures to ensure the safety and integrity of buildings in the event of an explosion.

Many other jurisdictions, including the US, have since amended their building codes to require that buildings subject to explosions or other accidents will not collapse to an extent disproportionate to the cause.

Two days after the Grenfell Tower fire in 2017, John Knapton, emeritus professor of structural engineering at Newcastle University, claimed that regulations which came into force in 1971, following lessons learned from Ronan Point, had improved building structural strength in such a way as to prevent the collapse of the Grenfell Tower, which was built in 1974.

Effect on housing
In 1985, the Building Research Establishment published a report entitled "The Structure of Ronan Point and other Taylor Woodrow – Anglian buildings" to advise local councils and building owners on checking the structural stability of their blocks. Southwark Council confirmed in 2017 that strengthening work ordered after Ronan Point may not have been carried out on the Ledbury Estate, after structural weaknesses were found that led to the evacuation of four tower blocks.

Within a couple of decades of the collapse of Ronan Point, the public's lack of confidence in the construction technique used at Ronan Point, together with the social problems within such developments, led to the demolition of many tower blocks. In particular, the construction technique involved metal bolts which expand when they rust and crack the concrete round them.  In 2018, it was reported that two tower blocks on the Broadwater Farm estate in Tottenham, Tangmere House and Northholt House, were structurally unsound and could collapse catastrophically if there is a gas explosion or if a vehicle collides with the base. Both are to be evacuated urgently. Other buildings in Broadwater Farm had less serious problems.

Legacy
In May 2018, 50 years after the partial collapse, Ronan Point was the subject of an experimental documentary film, And Then We Heard Shouts and Cries, by artist Ricky Chambers. Chambers' grandparents and mother had lived in flat 87 on the 18th floor of the tower block at the time of the gas explosion.

See also
List of structural failures and collapses
Grenfell Tower fire
Lakanal House fire
Structural robustness

References

Bibliography
A number of books have covered the collapse of Ronan Point, including Collapse: Why Buildings Fall Down by Phil Wearne .  This was written to accompany the television series of the same name shown on Channel 4 in early 2000.

Building Research Establishment reports:
The Structure of Ronan Point and other Taylor Woodrow-Anglian Buildings 1985 
Large panel system dwellings: preliminary information on ownership and condition 1986 
The structural adequacy and durability of large panel system dwellings 1987

External links
Blast Loading and Blast Effects on Structures – An Overview, 2007.
BBC News – On This Day – 16 May 1968 – 'Three die as tower block collapses'
London Flats Disaster – British Pathé news footage

Ronan Point: a fifty-year building safety problem

Buildings and structures completed in 1968
Buildings and structures demolished in 1986
Buildings and structures in the London Borough of Newham
Building collapses in the United Kingdom
Collapsed buildings and structures
Disasters in London
Explosions in 1968
Explosions in England
Former buildings and structures in the London Borough of Newham
Gas explosions
Residential buildings in London
Prefabricated buildings
Public inquiries in the United Kingdom
1968 disasters in the United Kingdom
1968 in London
Former skyscrapers
Demolished buildings and structures in London
Building collapses caused by fire